Elliott Pershing Stitzel (November 27, 1918 – May 21, 2005), better known by his stage name Stephen Elliott, was an American actor. His best known roles were that of the prospective father-in-law, Burt Johnson, in the hit 1981 film Arthur and as Chief Hubbard in the 1984 blockbuster Beverly Hills Cop.

Career

Theatre
From 1940 to 1942, Elliott studied acting with Sanford Meisner at New York's Neighborhood Playhouse. After serving in World War II with the United States Merchant Marine, he started a successful career on Broadway with his debut in Shakespeare's The Tempest; two years later, Elliott was selected by Robert Lewis to be one of The Actors Studio's founding members.

In 1967, Elliott was nominated for the Tony Award for Best Featured Actor in a Play for Marat/Sade. Two years later, he won the Drama Desk Award for A Whistle in the Dark. Additional Broadway credits include King Lear, The Miser, Georgy, The Crucible, and The Creation of the World and Other Business.

Television
Elliott's television credits include the role of Jane Wyman's first husband in Falcon Crest, General Padget in Columbo, Harold W. Smith in the 1988 television adaptation of Remo Williams, Texan millionaire attorney Scotty Demarest in Dallas, and Judge Harold Aldrich in Chicago Hope. He also appeared in the "Murder! Murder!" episode of The Eddie Capra Mysteries. In 1981 he had a small role as the newspaper magnate William Randolph Hearst in the TV serial Winston Churchill: The Wilderness Years. Highway To Heaven "Thoroughbreds" Episodes 1 and 2 with Helen Hunt and Micheal Landon 1985. He was a member of the regular cast of the short-lived 1988 situation comedy Trial and Error.

Radio
In 1981, Elliott played the role of Bail Organa, father of Princess Leia, in the radio drama adaptation of Star Wars.

Personal life
Elliott was born Elliott Pershing Stitzel in New York City. His marriage to Barbara Blaise was terminated by divorce in February 1947, according to The Kingston Daily Freeman (Kingston, NY), 4 October 1947, page 3. He married stage actress Nancy Chase on 9 October 1947 (Billboard, 18 October 1947, p. 47) and divorced in 1960. They had two children, Jency and Jon. 

He married his third wife, actress Alice Hirson, whom he met on Broadway in 1964; they were not married until 1980. He died in 2005 in Woodland Hills, California as result of congestive heart failure. Both Elliott and Hirson appeared in recurring roles on the television series Dallas.

Partial filmography

 Monodrama Theater (DuMont TV series, 1953)
 Three Hours to Kill (1954) - Sheriff Ben East
 Canyon Crossroads (1955) - Larson
 The Proud and Profane (1956)
 Street of Sinners (1957) - Bit part
 The Hospital (1971) - Dr. Sundstrom
 Death Wish (1974) - Police Commissioner
 The Gun (1974) - Art Hilliard
 Report to the Commissioner (1975) - Police Commissioner
 The Hindenburg (1975) - Captain Fellows
 Columbo: A Deadly State of Mind (1975, TV Series) - Carl Donner
 Young Joe, the Forgotten Kennedy (1977) - Joseph Kennedy Sr.
 Hawaii Five-O (1978, Episode: "Deadly Courier") - Enslow
 Dallas (1980-1987, TV Series) - Attorney Scotty Demarest
 Cutter's Way (1981) - J. J. Cord
 Arthur (1981) - Burt Johnson
 My Body, My Child (1982) - Edgar
 Prototype (1983, TV Movie) - Dr. Arthur Jarrett
 Benson (1984) - Whitey Endicott
 Beverly Hills Cop (1984) - Chief Hubbard
 Roadhouse 66 (1985) - Sam
 Murder, She Wrote: Armed Response (1985) - Dr. Sam
 Assassination (1987) - Fitzroy
 Perry Mason Movie: The Case of the Lost Love (1987, TV Series) - Elliot Moore
 Walk Like a Man (1987) - Walter Welmont
 Vultures (1987) - Theater Attendant
 Trial and Error (1988, TV series) - Edmund Kittie
 Arthur 2: On the Rocks (1988) - Burt Johnson
 Remo Williams: The Prophecy (1988) - Dr. Harold W. Smith
 When He's Not a Stranger (1989, TV Movie) - Attorney Foster
 Columbo: Grand Deceptions (1989, TV Series) - General Padget
 Taking Care of Business (1990) - Walter
 The Big One: The Great Los Angeles Earthquake'' (1990, TV Movie) - Owen

References

External links

 
 
Stephen Elliott at Internet Off-Broadway Database

1918 births
2005 deaths
American male film actors
American male television actors
American male stage actors
Male actors from New York City
20th-century American male actors
United States Merchant Mariners of World War II